The 1911 New Mexico gubernatorial election was held on November 7, 1911, to elect the first Governor of New Mexico.

Democratic nominee William C. McDonald defeated Republican nominee Holm O. Bursum.

General election

Candidates
William C. McDonald, Democratic, member of the New Mexico Cattle Sanitary Board
Holm O. Bursum, Republican, former member of the New Mexico Territorial Senate, member of the State constitutional convention in 1910
Dr. T. C. Rivera, Socialist

Results

References

1911
New Mexico
Gubernatorial